The 1940 United States Senate election in Massachusetts was held on November 5, 1940, with Democratic incumbent David I. Walsh defeating his challengers.

Democratic primary

Candidates
 David I. Walsh, incumbent U.S. Senator since 1926 (also served 1919–25) and former Governor of Massachusetts (1914–16)

Results
Senator Walsh was unopposed for renomination.

Republican primary

Candidates
 Henry Parkman Jr., Corporation Counsel for the City of Boston, former State Senator and Boston City Councilman

Results
Parkman was unopposed for the Republican nomination.

General election

Candidates
 Philip Frankfeld (Communist)
 Horace I. Hillis, perennial candidate (Socialist Labor)
 George Lyman Paine, Episcopal priest, and son of philanthropist Robert Treat Paine (Socialist)
 Henry Parkman Jr., Corporation Counsel for the City of Boston, former State Senator and Boston City Councilman (Republican)
 George L. Thompson, candidate for Governor in 1938 (Prohibition)
David I. Walsh, incumbent U.S. Senator since 1926 (also served 1919–25) and former Governor of Massachusetts (1914–16) (Democratic)

Results

References

1940
Massachusetts
1940 Massachusetts elections